Anacithara goodingii is a species of sea snail, a marine gastropod mollusk in the family Horaiclavidae.

Description
The length of the acuminate-ovate, white shell attains 7.5 mm, its diameter  mm. It contains 7 whorls. The aperture is narrow. The outer lip is thickened and slightly sinuate. The siphonal canal is short and narrow. The fine prominent plicate ribs (numbering 9–10) are continuous up the spire. The ribs are spirally marked with minute, dense striations. 
The spiral row of reddish dots on the ribs, two on the upper whorls and three on the body whorl, are the principal distinctive characters of this species.

Distribution
This marine species is endemic to New Zealand and occurs off Ninety Mile Beach, North Island.

References

External links
  Tucker, J.K. 2004 Catalog of recent and fossil turrids (Mollusca: Gastropoda). Zootaxa 682:1-1295.
 Biolib : Anacithara goodingii

goodingii
Gastropods of New Zealand
Gastropods described in 1884